The 1957 NAIA World Series was the inaugural edition of the annual tournament hosted by the National Association of Intercollegiate Athletics to determine the national champion of baseball among its member colleges and universities in the United States and Canada.

The tournament was played at Kokernot Field in Alpine, Texas, near the campus of Sul Ross State College.

Sul Ross State defeated Rollins in the championship game, 8–7, to win the inaugural NAIA World Series. Rollins player Frank Willis, however, was named tournament MVP.

The tournament featured eight teams in a single-elimination style tournament, with all first-round losers shifted into a secondary consolation bracket.

Bracket

Championship bracket

Consolation bracket

See also
 1957 NCAA University Division baseball tournament

Reference

NAIA World Series
NAIA World Series
NAIA World Series